The Armadillo was an extemporized improvised armoured fighting vehicle produced in Britain during the invasion crisis of 1940–1941. Based on a number of standard lorry (truck) chassis, it comprised a wooden fighting compartment protected by a layer of gravel and a driver's cab protected by mild steel plates. Armadillos were used by the RAF Regiment to protect aerodromes and by the Home Guard.

Design 
With the Fall of France in July 1940, it was a possibility that Germany might attempt to invade Britain. The British Government made frantic efforts to prepare to meet the threatened invasion. One particular problem was the defence of airfields against parachuting airborne troops.

An ideal solution to the problem of protecting the open space of an airfield would be to make use of armoured fighting vehicles such as tanks and armoured cars. However, the British Army lacked heavy equipment, having been forced to abandon much of it during the evacuation from Dunkirk. An alternative would be an improvised armoured fighting vehicle that did not compete for resources with conventional armaments. The form of vehicle that the Royal Air Force (RAF) needed was outlined:

The RAF started looking for a suitable vehicle at the end of May 1940 and by 4 June they settled on the design destined to be known as the Armadillo. This vehicle was a flat-bed truck, on the back of which was mounted a box-like fighting compartment in which soldiers could stand and fire small arms or use one or two crew-served weapons. Inside this was another, similar wooden box about  smaller all round; the gap between the boxes was filled with gravel.

This provided protection from rifle and machine gun bullets. The fighting compartment had an open top with a beam across it to support a Lewis Gun (a light machine gun) on a sliding mount. The drivers and the engine were protected by steel plates. Most Armadillos were armed with two Lewis Guns and three rifles.

Variants 

The Mk I Armadillo was produced with startling speed. Using a wide range of trucks conscripted from civilian service, the first 20 were delivered on 7 June and the complete consignment of 312 vehicles within just a couple of weeks. On 20 June, the Air Ministry ordered another 300 vehicles; these Mk II Armadillos would mostly be based on a standard Bedford OL 1½ and 3 ton chassis.

A later Mk III Armadillo was always based on a three-ton chassis, it had a slightly smaller fighting compartment now occupying only the front half of the truck's flat bed. On the rear half of the flat bed, a 37mm Coventry Ordnance Works gun was mounted. The COW gun was a 37 mm clip-loaded long-recoil autocannon designed at the end of the First World War for arming aircraft and used between the wars on flying boats. It fired a  High Explosive shell at modest velocity, but could be expected to be highly effective in its new role against landing aircraft, airborne troops or light vehicles. Fifty-five Mk III Armadillos were made. The crew comprised two drivers and three gunners.

In April 1942, a small number of Mk IIIs had their shingle protection replaced with "plastic armour" - a mixture of bitumen (or pitch) and granite or similar stone chippings.

Service history 
It did not matter that the vehicle was lightly armoured, because the soldiers it was expected to meet would be lightly equipped. What was of key importance was that the vehicle would survive the bombardment that was expected to immediately precede a landing. Armadillos were to be kept a short distance from the airfield, well hidden and protected but always ready to be called into action. Overweight, the Armadillo was unsuitable for travelling over rough or boggy ground. However, it did not need to travel far or fast, nor did it need to cope with hills; it could easily move along airfield taxiways and perimeter roads.

It was thought that commanders might be tempted to think of the Armadillo as a mobile pillbox rather than any sort of tank or armoured car. To counter such a view, instructions emphasised its use as a mobile unit, not a static fort and it was to be reserved for the defence of the airfield and not given other tasks such as transporting ammunition or being driven off to find parachutists.

The Armadillo was withdrawn in mid-1942, by which time 877 vehicles had been produced. The surviving vehicles were refurbished for other uses (some passing to the Home Guard), and Humber Light Reconnaissance Cars took over their role.

See also

Bedford OXA
Bison concrete armoured lorry
British anti-invasion preparations of World War II

Notes

References 

References

External links 

World War II armoured fighting vehicles of the United Kingdom
Military vehicles introduced from 1940 to 1944
Improvised armoured fighting vehicles
Improvised combat vehicles